Miss Ecuador is a national beauty pageant in Ecuador. The current Miss Ecuador is Nayelhi González from Esmeraldas, Esmeraldas Province. She won the title on September 3, 2022 and will represent Ecuador at Miss Universe 2022.

History
The very first winner of the Miss Ecuador pageant was Sara Chacón Zúñiga from Guayas province in 1930. The contest was inactive for 25 years until 1955 when Leonor Carcache from Guayas won the first modern title of Miss Ecuador and became the first representative of the country to the Miss Universe pageant, was held in Long Beach, California.

Representatives from the 24 provinces that make up Ecuador compete annually for the title of Miss Ecuador among others. Miss Ecuador selects representatives for two of the Big Four international beauty pageants, Miss Universe and Miss International. In addition, the pageant also selects candidates to represent Ecuador in other international contests such as Reina Hispanoamericana, Miss United Continents and Miss Landscapes International.

Note

 In 1966, 1967, 1973, 1978, 1979, 1981, 1982, 1988, 1990 and 1995, the Miss Ecuador title was appointed.
 In 1967, 1978, 1989 and 1996, the Miss Ecuador election/appointment was made the year before the edition to represent.
 In 1993, the Miss Ecuador election was not held in Guayaquil for very first time.   
 In 1996, Mónica Chalá was the first Afro-Ecuadorian in winning the Miss Ecuador title.
 In 2011, Claudia Schiess was the first non Ecuadorian-born in winning the Miss Ecuador title.
 Guayas has hosted the Miss Ecuador pageant for 46 editions. 
 Guayas is the most successful province at Miss Ecuador with 39 winners. 
 Zamora Chinchipe has never been represented at Miss Ecuador.

Titleholders
The following titleholders have represented Ecuador in three of the Big Four major international beauty pageants for women. These are Miss World, Miss Universe, and Miss International with the exception of Miss Earth which has a separate national franchise in Ecuador.

A.Lucía Vinueza was born in Cuenca, Azuay; but she represented the province of Guayas.
B.Mariela García was born in Cuenca, Azuay; but she represented the province of Manabí.
C.Soraya Hogonaga was born in Milagro, Guayas; but she represented the province of Pichincha.
D.Isabel Ontaneda was born in Cuenca, Azuay; but she represented the province of Pichincha.
E.Claudia Schiess was born in Basel, Switzerland; but she represented the province of Galápagos.

Representatives to international beauty pageants

Miss Ecuador Universo

The winner of Miss Ecuador represents her country at the Miss Universe pageant. On occasion, when the winner does not qualify (due to age) for either contest, a runner-up is sent.

 Lucía Vinueza (1981), Mariela García (1983) and Isabel Ontaneda (2002) were born in Cuenca, Azuay; but they represented their hometown's : Guayaquil, Portoviejo and Province of Pichincha respectively.

Miss Ecuador Internacional

Before 2013, the 2nd Runner-up used to compete at Miss International. Began 2013 the 1st Runner-up of Miss Ecuador represents her country at the Miss International pageant.

Past titleholders under Miss Ecuador org.

Miss Ecuador Mundo

Before 2013  Miss Ecuador org crowned Miss Mundo Ecuador where the winner represented Ecuador at Miss World. Since 2013 the Miss World Ecuador sends winners to Miss World. On occasion, when the winner does not qualify (due to age) for either contest, a runner-up is sent.

See also
Miss World Ecuador
Miss Earth Ecuador
Miss Teen Ecuador
Mister Ecuador

References

External links
Official Miss Ecuador website
Past titleholders

 
Beauty pageants in Ecuador
Ecuadorian awards
Ecuador